NHL 2003 is an ice hockey video game developed by EA Canada and published by EA Sports. It was released in 2002 as the successor to NHL 2002. Jarome Iginla appears as the cover athlete and spokesperson of the game. Iginla appears in the Behind The Scenes video to show the player how the game was made. It was the first installment of the NHL series to be released on GameCube.

Features
NHL 2003 introduced a new feature: the GameBreaker. It is activated once a player performs enough "dekes" and it is used to help change the momentum of the game, such as scoring a big goal, delivering a big hit or winning a big fight.

Commentary
The commentary in NHL 2003 is voiced by Jim Hughson and Don Taylor. Hughson has been the NHL series announcer since NHL '97, while Taylor first appeared in the previous year's version.

Reception

The game received "generally favorable reviews" on all platforms according to the review aggregation website Metacritic.

References

External links
 

NHL (video game series)
Electronic Arts games
Windows games
PlayStation 2 games
GameCube games
Xbox games
2002 video games
EA Sports games
Video games set in 2002
Video games set in 2003
Video games set in the United States
Video games set in Canada
Video games developed in Canada